Janani is a 1999 Indian Malayalam film, directed by Rajeevnath, starring Siddique in the lead role. Rajeevnath won the National Film Award for Best Direction.

Synopsis 
The film is about seven nuns who take care of an orphaned baby.

Cast
 Siddique as Father
 Kavitha Ladnier as Sister Mary Ann
 Latheef as Doctor
 Rosline as Sr. Victoria
 Santhakumari as Servant Eliyamma
 Rukhmini

Reception 
Reviewing the film at the Palm Springs Film Festival in 2000, Robert Koehler of Variety opined that "What appears to be a drama about how an elderly nun will fit into convent culture dissolves into random sequences of various innocuous relationships".

References

External links

1999 films
1990s Malayalam-language films
Films whose director won the Best Director National Film Award